Vicky Huang is a Canadian actress. Her film credits include Hiro, 88 Minutes and They Wait. In 2010 she appeared on an episode of the television series Shattered.

Filmography
Hardwired as Aide (2009)
Shadow of the Lotus as Lead (2008)
They Wait as Shen Lu (as Shen) (2007)
88 Minutes as Joanie Cates (2007)
Break a Leg, Rosie as Customer (2005)
Hiro as Vicky (2005)
The Shortest Dream as So-Rhee Moon (2005)
Insecticidal as Fumi (2005)
Extreme Ops as Kana (2002)
Try Seventeen as Cantonese Girl (2002)
Ragnarok as (Year unknown)
The Date as (Year unknown)
Death of a Clown as (1998)

TV series
Shattered - (Episodes:Harry Has a Wife?) as Xia Yeh (2010)
Whistler - (Episode: Hazed and Confused) as Mai Ling (2007)
Glass as Girl in China (2005)
Cold Squad - (Episode: Horton Killed a Wu) as Kara (2002)

Theatre
Neil Labute: things we said today as Lead
Once a Catholic as Ensemble
The Woman in White as Lead
The Crucible as Ensemble
Museum as Ensemble
Ten Lost Years as Ensemble

Personal life 
Huang is of Chinese descent.

External links

Vicky Huang's official website

Canadian film actresses
Canadian television actresses
Canadian actresses of Chinese descent
Living people
Actresses from Vancouver
21st-century Canadian actresses
Year of birth missing (living people)